Rumex hypogaeus (synonym Emex australis), commonly known in English as southern threecornerjack, devil's thorn,  or double gee (also doublegee, from the old Afrikaner name dubbeltge-doorn - 'double thorned'), is a herbaceous plant of the Polygonaceae. It is native in South Africa and is  an invasive species in Australia, Texas in the USA & Pakistan.

Description 
The base is  often reddish. The leaves are stalked and without any surface covering, with the leaf blade being 1-10 by 0.5–6 cm. There are 1 to 8 flowers with stamens per sheathed bundle and these flowers have narrow oblong tepals which are  1.5–2 mm. The female  flowers occur as groups of  1 to 4 per sheathed bundle, and the outer tepals are ovate to oblong and  4–6 mm in fruit, while the inner tepals are broadly triangular and, 5–6 mm in fruit. The  achenes (dry 1-seeded fruits not opening at maturity) are 4-6 by 2–3 mm, and shiny.

It flowers all year round.

Distribution and habitat 
It favours disturbed sites, on  sandy soils. It is native to South Africa and has become naturalised in California, Trinidad, Europe, India, Pakistan, Taiwan, Hawaii, and Australia.

Weed 
Common names in Australia, where it is a weed, include: bindies, spiny emex, doublegee, double gee, double-gee, three corner jack, three-cornered jack, goat's head burr, goathead, jackie, prickly jack, cape spinach, devil's face, devil's thorn, bullhead, bull head, and cat's head.

Treatment 
Small infestations and isolated plants of Rumex hypogaeus can be dug out. When plants are seeding then they should be destroyed by burning. Control programs work best when all plants are killed shortly after having emergence, and should continue for several years.

Gallery

References

External links
Jepson Manual Treatment
Distribution map showing where it is native and where introduced
Rumex hypogaeus occurrence data from GBIF
Emex australis Profile, photo gallery, distribution

hypogaeus
Plants used in traditional African medicine
Plants described in 1838